The 2016 Women's LEN Super Cup was the 11th edition of the Women's LEN Super Cup an annual water polo match organized by the LEN and contested by the reigning champions of the two main European club competitions. 

The match was played between the Euro League Champion (CN Sabadell) and the LEN Trophy Champion (CN Mataró) at the CN Barcelona swimming pool in Barcelona on November 6, 2016.

Match
 Time is CET (UTC+1).

Squads

CN Mataró La Sirena

Head coach: Florin Bonca

CN Sabadell Astralpool

Head coach: Ignasi Guiu

References

Women's LEN Super Cup
Len